Leslie Brown (1954 – August 5, 2016) was an American historian.

Life
Leslie Brown was born in New York City and grew up in Albany, New York. She graduated in 1977 from Tufts University with a B.A. in sociology, and from Duke University with an A. M. and Ph.D in History 1997. Following her graduation, she was a bartender, managed stores for CVS and McDonalds, drove trucks for Ryder, and worked at Skidmore College in the Admissions Office and as director of the Higher Education Opportunity Program. From 1990 to 1995, while a graduate student at Duke University, she co-coordinated "Behind the Veil: Documenting African American Life in the Jim Crow South", a project based at the Center for Documentary Studies at Duke. As part of that project, Brown conducted oral history interviews in North Carolina, and helped facilitate the collection of more than 1,200 oral history interviews with African American southerners throughout the region.

Brown's teaching and scholarship focused on the history of African American communities in post-Civil War America, particularly the experiences of women and workers. Her first book, Upbuilding Black Durham (UNC Press, 2008), was awarded the Frederick Jackson Turner prize, issued by the Organization of American Historians. In 2010, she published, with Anne M. Valk, Living with Jim Crow: African American Women and Memories of the Segregated South (Palgrave, 2010), based on interviews from the 'Behind the Veil Project.' It was awarded the annual book prize from the Oral History Association in 2011. She also published numerous articles and, at the time of her death, was working on a monograph on African-American women and migration, and a compilation of writing and speeches by Shirley Chisholm.

Brown was a dedicated teacher and mentor to many students, especially LGBTQ+ and students of color, for whom she advocated tirelessly. She had taught at Duke University, Skidmore College, the University of Missouri-St. Louis, and at Washington University in St. Louis, before going to Williams College in Williamstown, Massachusetts, where she taught from 2008 until her passing in 2016.<ref>"The Passing of Professor Leslie Brown", Office of the President, Williams College (Web.williams.edu), retrieved August 8, 2016.</ref>

She died in Boston of T-cell lymphoma/leukemia aged 61.

Awards
 2009 Frederick Jackson Turner Award
 2011 Oral History Association Book Prize

Works
 

References

External links
"Leslie Brown and 'Upbuilding Black Durham'", UNC Press blog"Leslie Brown: Black Women Historians in the Ivory Tower", History News Network''
Leslie Brown Papers at Williams College Archives & Special Collections 
Leslie Brown Papers at Duke University Special Collections Library 
Leslie Brown obituary, American Historical Association

1954 births
2016 deaths
Historians from New York (state)
Tufts University School of Arts and Sciences alumni
Duke University alumni
Duke University faculty
Skidmore College faculty
Washington University in St. Louis faculty
Williams College faculty
American women historians
People from Albany, New York
Historians of African Americans